Rare Breed may refer to:

 Rare breed, a breed of poultry or livestock that has a very small breeding population
 Rare Breed (album), by MC Breed, 2000
 Rare Breed, a late 1960s band whose members included Ozzy Osbourne and Geezer Butler
 The Rare Breed, a 1966–67 era band whose recordings were released by the Ohio Express
 A Rare Breed, a 1984 drama film starring George Kennedy
The Rare Breed, a 1966 western film

See also 
 
 Dying Breed (disambiguation)
 Endangered species
 Lists of breeds